Jess Collins (August 6, 1923 – January 2, 2004), simply known today as Jess, was an American visual artist.

Biography 
Jess was born Burgess Franklin Collins in Long Beach, California. He was drafted into the military and worked on the production of plutonium for the Manhattan Project.  After his discharge in 1946, Jess worked at the Hanford Atomic Energy Project in Richland, Washington, and painted in his spare time, but his dismay at the threat of atomic weapons led him to abandon his scientific career and focus on his art.

In 1949, Jess enrolled in the California School of the Arts (now the San Francisco Art Institute) and, after breaking with his family, began referring to himself simply as "Jess". In the late 1940s, Jess met Robert Duncan and the painter Lyn Brockway, and became active in numerous exhibitions, poetry gatherings, and creative endeavors through their circle. He met Robert Duncan in 1951 and began a relationship with the poet that lasted until Duncan's death in 1988.  In 1952, in San Francisco, Jess, with Duncan and painter Harry Jacobus, opened the King Ubu Gallery, which became an important venue for alternative art and which remained so when, in 1954, poet Jack Spicer reopened the space as the Six Gallery.

Many of Jess's paintings and collages have themes drawn from chemistry, alchemy, the occult, and male beauty, including a series called Translations (1959–1976) which is done with heavily laid-on paint in a paint-by-number style. In 1975, the Wadsworth Atheneum displayed six of the "Translations" paintings in their Matrix 2 exhibition. In the late 1950s, Jess also filled Pauline Kael's home on Oregon St in Berkeley, CA, with fantastical and Romantic murals, which still adorn the walls today. Collins also created elaborate collages using old book illustrations and comic strips (particularly, the strip Dick Tracy, which he used to make his own strip Tricky Cad).  Jess's final work, Narkissos, is a complex rendered 6'x5' drawing owned by the San Francisco Museum of Modern Art.

A Jess retrospective (Jess: A Grand Collage, 1951–1993) toured the United States in 1993 to 1994, accompanied by a book of the same title.  The book included pictures of some of the paintings and collages from the tour. Interspersed between the pictures were essays by various contributors including poet Michael Palmer who wrote an extended piece on Jess's Narkissos.

Sections of Jess's paintings 'Arkadia Last Resort' were used by Faithless in 2004 for the front covers to their single "I Want More".

In 2008, an exhibition of Jess's drawings was held at Gallery Paule Anglim in San Francisco.

Museum collections 

 San Francisco Museum of Modern Art, San Francisco, CA
 The Fine Arts Museums of San Francisco, San Francisco, CA
 The di Rosa Collection
 The Museum of Modern Art, New York City, NY
 The Metropolitan Museum of Art, New York City, NY
 The National Gallery of Art, Washington, D.C.
 The Crocker Art Museum, Sacramento, CA

References

Further reading
O! Tricky Cad & Other Jessoterica. Edited by Michael Duncan. (Siglio, 2012) 
Jess: To and From the Printed Page. John Ashbery, Thomas Evans, Lisa Jarnot; (Independent Curators International, 2007) 
Jess, a Grand Collage, 1951-1993. (Buffalo Fine Arts / Albright Knox Art Gallery, 1993)

External links
Jess Collins Trust
San Francisco Art Institute: Jess Collins, BFA 1951 from San Francisco Chronicle, January 7, 2004  by Kenneth Baker
Ask/ART: Jess
Jess: To and From the Printed Page exhibition of Jess's impastos from his "Translation" series together with many of his collages and designs, as well as the books and magazines in which they were reproduced
Guide to the Jess Papers at The Bancroft Library
Pulled Through Time: A "Caltech News" Reporter Traces the Life of an Elusive Artist
 Gallery Paule Anglim

"Jess: Master of Collage Aesthetic" by Michael Duncan at Siglio Press

1923 births
2004 deaths
American gay artists
People from Long Beach, California
Artists from California
San Francisco Art Institute alumni
Artists from the San Francisco Bay Area
LGBT people from California
20th-century American LGBT people